The Maghreb wheatear (Oenanthe halophila) is a bird, a species of wheatear found in northern Africa. It is a small passerine in a group formerly classed as members of the thrush family Turdidae, but now more generally considered to be part of the Old World flycatcher family Muscicapidae.

The Maghreb wheatear (O. halophila) and basalt wheatear (O. warriae) were formerly considered subspecies of the mourning wheatear, but were split as distinct species by the IOC in 2021.

References

Wheatears
Birds of North Africa
Birds described in 1859
Taxa named by Henry Baker Tristram